The Cameroon dwarf gecko (Lygodactylus conraui), also known commonly as Conrau's dwarf gecko, is a species of lizard in the family Gekkonidae. The species is native to West Africa and Central Africa.

Etymology
The specific name, conraui, is in honor of German colonial agent Gustav Conrau.

Geographic range
L. conraui is found from Sierra Leone to Cameroon, Equatorial Guinea, and Gabon.

Reproduction
L. conraui is oviparous.

References

Further reading
Loveridge A (1947). "Revision of the African Lizards of the Family Gekkonidae". Bulletin of the Museum of Comparative Zoölogy at Harvard College 98: 1–469. (Lygodactylus conraui, pp. 220–221).
Rösler H (1902). "Kommentierte Liste der rezent, subrezent und fossil bekannten Geckotaxa (Reptilia: Gekkonomorpha)". Gekkota 2: 28–153. (Lygodactylus conraui, p. 92). (in German).
Tornier G (1902). "Die Crocodile, Schildkröten und Eidechsen in Kamerun [The Crocodilians, Turtles and Lizards in Cameroon]". Zoologische Jahrbücher. Abteilung für Systematik, Geographie und Biologie der Tiere 15 (6): 663–677 + Plate 35. (Lygodactylus conraui, new species, pp. 670–671 + Plate 35, figure 3). (in German).

Lygodactylus
Reptiles described in 1902
Taxa named by Gustav Tornier
Reptiles of West Africa
Fauna of Benin
Reptiles of Cameroon
Reptiles of Equatorial Guinea
Reptiles of Gabon
Fauna of Ghana
Fauna of Ivory Coast
Fauna of Togo